This is a list of airlines which have a current air operator's certificate issued by the Civil Aviation Authority of Nepal.

Scheduled airlines

Bishwo Airways and Blue Airways are under process of obtaining operation license from CAAN.

Charter airlines

See also
List of defunct airlines of Nepal
List of defunct airlines of Asia
List of airports in Nepal
List of air carriers banned in the European Union

Notes

References 

 
Nepal
Airlines
Airlines
Nepal